Provincial Trunk Highway 2 (PTH 2) is a  highway in the Canadian province of Manitoba. It runs from Highway 13 at the Manitoba-Saskatchewan border to Winnipeg's Perimeter Highway near Oak Bluff.

PTH 2 is the Manitoba portion of the Red Coat Trail.

Route description

PTH 2 begins in the Rural Municipality of Pipestone at the Saskatchewan border, with the road, and the Red Coat Trail, continuing west as Saskatchewan Highway 13 (Hwy 13) towards the town of Redvers. The highway heads east, along with the Red Coat Trail, to pass along the northern edge of Sinclair, where it shares a  concurrency (overlap) with PR 256, before making a sharp curve to the south, then another to the east as it passes through Linklater. It now passes through the town of Reston and the community of Pipestone, where it has an intersection with PTH 83, before crossing into the Rural Municipality of Sifton.

PTH 2 pass just a few kilometers to the south of Oak Lake as it travels through the communities of Findlay and Deleau, where it has an intersection with PR 254 and have a several kilometer long concurrency with PTH 21, which involves a sharp curve to the north, then the east. The highway crosses into the Municipality of Souris - Glenwood at the second intersection with PTH 21.

PTH 2 has an intersection with PR 347 before crossing Plum Creek to enter Souris. The highway crosses a railroad track and passes through neighborhoods before having an intersection with PTH 22 and PR 250 at the northern edge of downtown. It begins paralleling the Souris River and leaves Souris as it passes along the south side of Souris Glenwood Industrial Air Park and crosses another railroad track. Shortly thereafter, the highway crosses into the Municipality of Oakland - Wawanesa at an intersection with PR 348.

PTH 2 passes just to the north of Carroll before having a short concurrency with PTH 10 (also known as the John Bracken Highway), where it crosses yet another railroad track. It heads east to pass on the southern edge of Nesbitt, where it has an intersection with PR 346, before curving southeast, having an intersection with PR 344 and crossing the Souris River for the second and final time. The highway travels along the southern edge of Wawanesa, having intersections with Tenterfield Road (which leads to Dunrea) and PR 340 (which leads to Wawanesa proper), before crossing into the Municipality of Glenboro - South Cypress.

PTH 2 makes a sharp curve to the south, then east, to have intersections with PTH 18 and PR 530, before heading due eastward to cross a creek and pass through Glenboro, where it junctions with PTH 5. The highway travels along the northern edge of Cypress River, where it has an intersection with PR 342 and crosses the river of the same name, before entering the Rural Municipality of Victoria.

PTH 2 curves more northeastward as it passes through Holland, where it has an intersection with PTH 34 and parallels a former railroad line, before entering the Municipality of Norfolk Treherne. The highway becomes more curvy as it passes through Treherne, where it has a concurrency with PR 242, and Rathwell, where it junctions with PR 244, before crossing into the Rural Municipality of Grey.

PTH 2 crosses PR 305 before going through a switchback and traveling through St. Claude, where it crosses PR 240. It goes through another switchback as follows along the northern and eastern edges of Haywood before traveling through Elm Creek, where it has intersections with PTH 13 and PR 247, as well as crossing over a railroad track. The highway continues northeast to pass through the communities of Culross and Fannystelle, where it has an intersection with PR 248, before entering the Rural Municipality of Macdonald.

PTH 2 passes through Starbuck, where it has an intersection with PR 332 and crosses the La Salle River, before heading due east to have an intersection with PR 424 and a short concurrency with PR 334. The highway now travels along the southern edge of Oak Bluff, where it meets PTH 3 at a roundabout shortly before PTH 2, and the Red Coat Trail, both come to an end at an intersection with PTH 100 (South Perimeter Highway / Trans-Canada Highway).

The entire length of Provincial Trunk Highway 2 is a rural, two-lane highway traveling through the relatively flat prairies of southern Manitoba.

History

Before the implementation of the Winnipeg's city route system, PTH 2 shared McGillivray Boulevard with PTH 3 to Pembina Highway. This roadway is now designated as Winnipeg Route 155.

Major intersections

External links 
Official Name and Location - Declaration of Provincial Trunk Highways Regulation - The Highways and Transportation Act - Provincial Government of Manitoba
Official Highway Map - Published and maintained by the Department of Infrastructure - Provincial Government of Manitoba (see Legend and Maps#1 & 2)
Google Maps Search - Provincial Trunk Highway 2

References

002